Artists House was a jazz and blues record company and label established in 1977 by John Snyder.

History
The label released music by artists that label founder John Snyder had worked with while running the Horizon subsidiary of A&M Records, including Jim Hall, Paul Desmond, Charlie Haden, and Ornette Coleman. The label was the first in North America to release an album by James Blood Ulmer. Artist House reportedly gave its recording artists control over music selection, production and packaging. In addition to working with jazz artists, Snyder also produced blues musicians including Clarence "Gatemouth" Brown, James Cotton, and Etta James, and the blues-rock Derek Trucks Band.

Snyder released new blues band Scrapomatic in 2002. Artists House also released Nancy Harrow, Oteil & The Peacemakers, Jason Crosby, Bob Brookmeyer & Kenny Wheeler, Steve Haines Quintet, Vijay Lytev albums in 2003. Artists House released Nancy Harrow CD "The Cat Who Went to Heaven" in 2005. Snyder is currently president of Artists House Foundation.

Discography
Artists House released fourteen LPs between 1978 and 1981.

Artists House relaunched in 2003 releasing CDs, DVDs and multimedia discs.

See also
 Free jazz
 blues rock
 Scrapomatic
 Derek Trucks

References

Jazz record labels